Air Macau Company Limited (Portuguese: Companhia de Transportes Aéreos Air Macau, S.A.R.L.) is the flag carrier airline of Macau. It operates services to 24 destinations in Mainland China, Japan, South Korea, Thailand, Taiwan and Vietnam, from the airline's hub at Macau International Airport.  In 2014, Air Macau carried 2.12 million passengers with an average load factor of 68.20% and carried 15,900 tonnes of cargo and mail.

History
The airline was established on 13 September 1994, and began commercial operations on 9 November 1995, with a flight from Macau to Beijing and Shanghai. Prior to 1995, there was no air service to Macau since 1962  other than the helicopter service. Seaplane service had been provided by Macau Air Transport Company from 1948 to 1961. One-aircraft service between Beijing, Shanghai and Taipei began on 8 December 1995. The first pure-freighter service was launched on 7 October 2002, between Taipei and Shenzhen via Macau.

In 1999 the airline had 1.1 million passengers each year, with 80% of them originating from two cities in the Republic of China on Taiwan: Kaohsiung and Taipei.

In 2006 Air Macau was owned by China National Aviation Holding (51%), TAP Air Portugal (20%), STDM (14%), EVA Air (5%), the government of Macau (5%) and Macau investors (5%). It employs 1,245 staff (at March 2016). In 2009 two companies controlled by Edmund Ho, the Chief Executive of Macau sold a combined 1.25% stake to Air China for a sum undisclosed by the parties. In 2010 TAP sold its share to Air China.

Corporate affairs

The head office is currently in the Edifício CNAC in Sé (Cathedral Parish) on the Macau Peninsula. Previously it was in the Edifício Tai Wah in Sé.

Destinations

The airline currently operates its own aircraft to 24 destinations including 15 destinations in mainland China.

Codeshare agreements
Air Macau has codeshare agreements with the following airlines:

 Air China
 All Nippon Airways
 Asiana Airlines
 Philippine Airlines
 Shenzhen Airlines
 Thai Airways

Air Macau and All Nippon Airways officially launch frequent flyer program cooperation from July 1, 2010. Air Macau Privileges members will earn mileages on all scheduled flights operated by All Nippon Airways and marketed by All Nippon Airways or Air Macau, and redeem Award Travel on all scheduled flights operated and marketed by All Nippon Airways.

Frequent flyer
Air Macau has its own frequent flyer program called Privileges. On 1 January 2015 Privileges merged with Phoenix Miles, which is Air China frequent flyer program.

Fleet

Current fleet

Former fleet
Two Boeing 727-100Fs were rented to provide air cargo service to Shenzhen and Taiwan from 2002 to 2006; both have returned to revenue service Transmile Air Services (and repainted from Air Macau livery). Both aircraft were replaced with two A300-600RFs owned by Air Macau. These two Airbus A300 left the company in 2012. Two old A321-100 were replaced by two new A321-200 in 2013. In 2020 two Airbus A319-100 were retired.

Livery
Although Air Macau serves as Macau's flag carrier, the Special Administrative Region of Macau flag has never appeared on any of its aircraft, similar to Hong Kong's Cathay Pacific. However, unlike Cathay Pacific, which carried a Union Jack on its aircraft prior to the Hong Kong SAR's 1997 handover, the flag of Portugal never appeared on any Air Macau aircraft prior to the 1999 handover.

Macau Asia Express
Macau Asia Express was a failed low-cost airline project, which was to be based in Macau and originally to be launched in 2007, offering scheduled flights mostly to mainland China. It was founded on 24 January 2006 with an initial funding of $30 million. It was owned by Air Macau (51%) and ST-CNAC (CNAC and Shun Tak Holdings) (49%). The aircraft fleet would have consisted of 6 Airbus A320 short-medium haul jet aircraft, which was planned to be expanded to 15-20 aircraft over the first years in operation.

In November 2007, the Macau Daily News reported that Macau Asia Express was suffering funding problems, which led to a delay at the taking-over of the already ordered aircraft, and finally the revocal of the Air Operator's Certificate in 2008.

See also
 Transport in Macau

References

External links 

  

Airlines of Macau
Airlines established in 1994
1994 establishments in Macau
Brands of Macau